Julianne Alexandra Hough (born July 20, 1988) is an American dancer, actress, and singer. In 2007, she joined the cast of ABC's Dancing with the Stars as a professional dancer, winning two seasons with her celebrity partners. After leaving the show in 2009, she returned in 2014 to serve as a permanent judge on Dancing with the Stars, a position she held until 2017. For her work on the series, she has received three nominations for the Primetime Emmy Award for Outstanding Choreography, winning once in 2015 with her brother Derek Hough.

Hough made her acting debut in the 2001 film Harry Potter and the Philosopher's Stone, but played her first major role in the 2010 film Burlesque, which was followed by leading roles as Ariel in Footloose, Sherrie in Rock of Ages, and Katie in Safe Haven. In 2016, she played Sandy in the live Fox television production of Grease. She also served as a judge on America's Got Talent for its 14th season. In 2022, she made her Broadway theatre debut in the political farce POTUS: Or, Behind Every Great Dumbass Are Seven Women Trying to Keep Him Alive. That same year she hosted the 75th Tony Awards: Act One alongside Darren Criss which streamed on Paramount+.

Early life
Hough was born in Orem, Utah, the youngest of five children in a Mormon family. Her parents are Bruce and Marianne Hough; her father was twice chairman of the Utah Republican Party. Her brother, Derek Hough, is also a professional dancer. She also has three older sisters: Sharee, Marabeth and Katherine. All four of Hough's grandparents were dancers. She is also a second cousin of musicians Riker, Rydel, Rocky and Ross Lynch from R5, their maternal grandmothers being sisters.

Hough's formal training began at the Center Stage Performing Arts Studio in Orem  where she danced with Josh Murillo, among others, in Latin Ballroom. She began dancing competitively at nine. When she was 10, Julianne's parents, who were divorcing, sent Julianne and her brother Derek to London to live and study with their coaches, Corky and Shirley Ballas. The Ballases tutored the Houghs alongside their own son, Mark. At the Italia Conti Academy of Theatre Arts Hough and her brother  received training in song, theatre, gymnastics and many forms of dance, including jazz, ballet, and tap. When Hough was 12, the three children formed their own pop music trio 2B1G ("2 Boys, 1 Girl"). They performed at dance competitions in the UK and the U.S., and showcased in a UK television show. At 15, Hough became the youngest dancer, and the only American, to win both Junior World Latin Champion and International Latin Youth Champion at the Blackpool Dance Festival. After returning to the U.S., she attended the Las Vegas Academy and Alta High School.

Career

Hough was one of the Million Dollar Dancers in the 2006 ABC game show called Show Me the Money. She won season four of the U.S. edition of Dancing with the Stars with her partner, Olympic gold medal-winning speed skater Apolo Ohno, making Hough the youngest professional dancer to win on the program. On November 27, 2007, Hough and her partner, three-time Indianapolis 500 champion Hélio Castroneves, became the winners of season five. Hough returned for season six with radio host/comedian Adam Carolla, but they were eliminated in week four. In July 2008, Hough was nominated at the 60th Primetime Emmy Awards in the category of "Outstanding Choreography" for her mambo "Para Los Rumberos" (performed with partner Hélio Castroneves) on Dancing with the Stars.

On August 25, 2008, the cast of season seven was announced, and Hough was partnered with Hannah Montana actor Cody Linley. She felt abdominal pains during their jitterbug performance on October 27, 2008, and was immediately rushed to a hospital following the encore performance. She subsequently had surgery to have her appendix removed, causing her to miss several performances; Edyta Śliwińska stood in for her. Hough returned to the show, although the pair was ultimately eliminated in the semifinals competition. She appeared on the November 12 results show dancing the jive to "Great Balls of Fire" with her brother for the "Design-A-Dance" contest.

On November 20, 2008, Hough was on Ryan Seacrest's radio show, On Air with Ryan Seacrest. She announced that, in order to further her music career, she would not be returning to Dancing with the Stars for the foreseeable future. However, she did return for season eight, partnering with country singer Chuck Wicks. They were voted off in week eight of the competition and came in sixth place. They then began dating after the season was over. On October 11, 2011, Hough returned to Dancing with the Stars and danced with her Footloose co-star Kenny Wormald twice, and with her brother. She returned again on May 15, 2012, in a dance performance to promote her film Rock of Ages. On October 7, 2013, she was guest judge in place of Len Goodman, which was the first time a former pro dancer came back to judge. In September 2014, she returned as a permanent judge on the panel, a position she held until 2017. She returned to the show as a guest judge in 2021, filling in for her brother Derek.

Move Live On Tour
On March 18, 2014, Hough and her brother Derek announced a summer tour of over 40 cities across the U.S. and Canada, called "Move Live on Tour", which would include dancing and singing from both of them, and the appearance of a group of dancers employed by the Houghs who earned their jobs through auditions. They embarked on the sold-out tour on May 25, 2014, in Park City, Kansas, and ended it in Los Angeles on July 26, 2014. Due to the success of ticket sales and several sold-out venues before the tour had officially kicked off, several more shows were added to the tour schedule, which also sold out. For the tour choreography, the Hough siblings collaborated with Nappytabs.

Following the success of the 2014 tour and high demand, the Houghs announced the return of "Move Live on Tour" in the summer of 2015. Spanning from June 12, 2015, to August 8, 2015, the sold-out tour visited over 40 cities throughout the U.S. and Canada, and visited larger venues than in the previous year. Tabitha and Napoleon D'umo "Nappytabs" returned as collaborating choreographers alongside the Hough siblings. Auditions were also held to recruit a new group of dancers to join the Houghs, although some back-up dancers from the previous year returned.

On December 14, 2016, they announced, via social media, that they would be going on a new tour, "MOVE BEYOND Live on Tour", in 2017.

Music
Hough's first country-music single, "Will You Dance With Me", was released to iTunes and Wal-Mart in May 2007 to raise money for the American Red Cross. The song placed at number 100 on the Billboard Pop 100 chart. She later signed with Universal Music Group Nashville's Mercury Nashville division.

Her 2008 self-titled debut album was recorded in Nashville and produced by David Malloy, who has worked with Reba McEntire and Eddie Rabbitt, among others. Hough's album, which met with mixed reviews, debuted at number one  on the Top Country Albums chart on May 31, and also peaked at number three on the Billboard 200. Hough's second single, and the first to be released to country radio, was "That Song in My Head".

Hough joined Brad Paisley's 2008 Tour, along with Jewel and Chuck Wicks. Hough, Paisley, and Willie Nelson appeared in the video for the Snoop Dogg song "My Medicine".

Hough appeared in a Juicy Fruit commercial in the fall of 2008, and released an EP of Christmas music called Sounds of the Season: The Julianne Hough Holiday Collection. She performed her second single "My Hallelujah Song" on Dancing With the Stars on November 18, 2008, with her brother Derek Hough, Mark Ballas, and Lacey Schwimmer dancing.

Hough, LeAnn Rimes, Jessica Simpson, and Kellie Pickler announced the 2009 Academy of Country Music Award nominees in February 2009. Hough was nominated for the Top New Female Vocalist award, a fan-voted award, which she subsequently won. Hough won the Top New Artist award at the 44th Annual Academy of Country Music Awards on April 5, 2009, and released a single, "Is That So Wrong", to country radio on June 21, 2010. It was intended as the lead single for her second album, Wildfire, but the album was never released.

In June 2012, Hough told AOL's The Boot that her second album was "completely done" and that she was initially "really, really looking forward to the record." However, she also stated that, due to the underperforming lead single and having "a lot of momentum" in her film career,  no plans have been made  to release Wildfire. She does intend to resume focusing on her music career at some point, though: "I feel like when I have the time to focus on it, and when I feel like it is the right time, [I'll return to] my music," she said.

Acting and other appearances
Hough's first acting role was in the 2001 feature film Harry Potter and the Philosopher's Stone, in an uncredited role as a "Hogwarts schoolgirl". She appeared in the 2010 musical Burlesque, starring Cher and Christina Aguilera. In the film, which chronicles a small-town girl (Aguilera) who finds success at a Los Angeles burlesque club, Hough plays a dancer named Georgia.

Hough's first leading role was as Ariel Moore in the 2011 remake of the Paramount film Footloose, opposite Kenny Wormald as Ren McCormack. Filming began in September 2010. The film was released on October 14, 2011. Hough played the role of Sherrie Christian in the 2012 film adaptation of the Broadway musical Rock of Ages, alongside Tom Cruise, Catherine Zeta-Jones and Malin Akerman. That same year she filmed her starring role opposite Josh Duhamel in the romantic drama Safe Haven, based on the novel of the same name by Nicholas Sparks, which was released on February 14, 2013. Hough also starred in the comedy-drama Paradise as Lamb Mannerheim, which was released on October 18, 2013. She starred alongside Russell Brand, who had previously co-starred with Hough in Rock of Ages.

Hough starred as protagonist Mallory Rutledge in the 2015 thriller film Curve opposite Teddy Sears. That same year she appeared on business coach Lewis Howes' podcast where they had a discussion and it ended with him asking to salsa dance with her. Hough returned to musical performances portraying the role of Sandy Young for Fox's live television presentation of the musical Grease on January 31, 2016. Hough and brother Derek hosted the 2016 The Wonderful World of Disney: Magical Holiday Celebration and The Disney Parks' Magical Christmas Celebration. It was televised by ABC on Thanksgiving night, November 24, and Christmas Day, December 25. The Hough siblings introduced performances by Garth Brooks, Trisha Yearwood and Kelly Clarkson. A companion holiday album, Disney Channel Holiday Hits, was released November 18, 2016.

In 2018, she was cast as Jolene in the episode of the same name from the Netflix anthology series Heartstrings, based on the Dolly Parton song. In February 11, 2019, it was announced that Hough had joined the NBC talent competition series America's Got Talent. However, she was announced to be exiting in November 22 in the same year after one season.

In 2020, Hough partnered with entertainment company Meet Cute for a three-part Transformation podcast series. Meet Cute, along with Hough’s production banner, Canary House Productions, wrote, executive produced, and voice acted in the series. As the title of the series suggests, Transformation aligns with Canary House’s mission to impact lives through stories of transformation, self-discovery and identity.

Broadway debut 
Hough made her Broadway debut as Dusty in Selina Fillinger's comedic play POTUS: Or, Behind Every Great Dumbass Are Seven Women Trying to Keep Him Alive. Performances began on April 14, 2022 at the Shubert Theatre. Hough received rave reviews for her comic performance with Entertainment Weekly declaring, "Julianne Hough is particularly mesmerizing...[she] could easily be a mere stereotype, but she surprises at every turn."

Hough hosted the first hour of the 75th Tony Awards alongside Darren Criss which was aired on Paramount+. The New York Times praised her hosting capabilities writing, "[she] delighted us with her endearing eagerness to put on a show." 
Critic Elizabeth Vincentelli also praised her adding, "she who didn’t miss a step...[she] had a sparkly showbiz quality peppered with an adorably enthusiastic nerdiness". She also presented Best Book of a Musical on the main telecast which aired on CBS.

Personal life
In October 2013, Hough told the New York Post that although she was no longer a practicing member of the Church of Jesus Christ of Latter-day Saints, she was glad that she was raised in the church.

Hough dated fellow country singer Chuck Wicks from August 2008 to November 2009; when the two had a mutual break-up, it inspired Hough's song "Is That So Wrong". Hough dated Ryan Seacrest from April 2010 to March 2013. In February 2014, it was revealed that she had begun dating NHL player Brooks Laich, then of the Washington Capitals, in December 2013. The couple announced their engagement on August 18, 2015, and were married on July 8, 2017. They separated in 2020, but later attempted to reconcile. Hough filed for divorce on November 2, 2020; the divorce was finalized on February 22, 2022.

Hough attracted controversy in October 2013 when she donned blackface as part of a Halloween costume depicting Uzo Aduba's character Suzanne "Crazy Eyes" Warren from the Netflix comedy-drama Orange Is the New Black. Hough later apologized, writing on Twitter, "I realize my costume hurt and offended people and I truly apologize."

Hough has been diagnosed with endometriosis since 2008, and went public with it to help de-stigmatize the conditions surrounding the disease.

Hough describes herself as "not straight". She has a close friendship with Nina Dobrev.

Dancing with the Stars performances

With Apolo Anton Ohno
(average 27.53)

With Hélio Castroneves
(average 27.13)

With Adam Carolla
(average 18.5)

With Cody Linley
(average 23.56)

 Weeks 7 and 8, Hough was recovering from surgery. Linley danced with Edyta Śliwińska during this time.
 Score was awarded by stand in judge Michael Flatley.

With Chuck Wicks
(average 23.22)

Discography

Albums / EPs

Singles

Guest singles

Soundtrack appearances

Music videos

Filmography

Film

Television

Theatre

Podcasts

Awards and nominations

References

External links

 
 
 
 

1988 births
Living people
21st-century American actresses
21st-century American singers
21st-century American women singers
American expatriates in England
Actresses from Las Vegas
Actresses from Utah
Alumni of the Italia Conti Academy of Theatre Arts
American ballroom dancers
American choreographers
American women country singers
American female dancers
American film actresses
Country musicians from Utah
Dancers from Nevada
Dancers from Utah
Dancing with the Stars (American TV series) winners
Former Latter Day Saints
LGBT actresses
LGBT dancers
LGBT people from Nevada
LGBT people from Utah
American LGBT singers
Mercury Records artists
People from Orem, Utah
Primetime Emmy Award winners
Singers from Nevada
Singers from Utah
Judges in American reality television series
People with Endometriosis